The Château de Castelnau-Montratier was originally a 13th-century castle in the commune of Castelnau-Montratier in the Lot département of France.

The château  has 13th century façade, built in stone and in which are three double windows, each surmounted by an arch resting on a sculpted capital.

The castle is privately owned. It has been listed since 1924 as a monument historique by the French Ministry of Culture.

See also
List of castles in France

References

Bibliography

External links
 

Castles in Lot
Châteaux in Lot (department)
Monuments historiques of Lot (department)